Rotten to the Core may refer to:

 Rotten to the Core (film), 1965 film starring Thorley Walters
 Rotten to the Core (album), 2007 album by X-Fusion
 "Rotten to the Core" (song), 2015 Disney song from the film Descendants